Martin Hosták (born November 11, 1967 in Hradec Králové, Czechoslovakia) is a retired Czech professional ice hockey player. He spent most of his hockey career in the Czech Extraliga and Sweden's Elitserien but spent parts of two National Hockey League seasons with the Philadelphia Flyers.

He worked as a color commentator and studio analyst for Extraliga and international hockey on Czech TV until 2017. He now works as a general manager of a Czech hockey club Aukro Berani Zlín.

Career statistics

Regular season and playoffs

International

References

External links
 

1967 births
Czechoslovak ice hockey right wingers
Czech ice hockey right wingers
HC Sparta Praha players
Hershey Bears players
Living people
Luleå HF players
Olympic ice hockey players of the Czech Republic
Ice hockey players at the 1994 Winter Olympics
Modo Hockey players
Philadelphia Flyers draft picks
Philadelphia Flyers players
Södertälje SK players
Sportspeople from Hradec Králové
Czech ice hockey coaches
Czechoslovak expatriate sportspeople in the United States
Czechoslovak expatriate ice hockey people
Czech expatriate ice hockey players in the United States
Czech expatriate ice hockey players in Sweden